Podmežakla Hall (Dvorana Podmežakla) is an indoor sporting arena located in Jesenice, Slovenia. It is the home of the HDD Jesenice ice hockey team. It is also the site of the Triglav Trophy, an annual international figure skating competition held each spring. The name Podmežakla (literally 'below Mežakla') is derived from its location on the southwest bank of the Sava Dolinka, directly below the Mežakla Plateau.

History
The hall was opened in 1978 and was expanded between 2009 and 2011. In March 2011, the hall was closed after inspectors found that the ice hockey club was allowed to host spectators in the newly built east stand without official state permission. The state inspectors also found that the Municipality of Jesenice did not obtain a building permit during the last major renovation in 1997.

The hall was renovated in 2013 for the FIBA EuroBasket 2013 championship.

References 

Indoor ice hockey venues in Slovenia
Indoor arenas in Slovenia
Sport in Jesenice, Jesenice
Sports venues completed in 1978
Basketball venues in Slovenia
Articles containing video clips
1978 establishments in Slovenia
20th-century architecture in Slovenia